PMM  may refer to:

 Makarov PMM, a variant of the Makarov PM  pistol
 Pacific Meridional Mode
 Partido ng Manggagawa at Magsasaka, a Philippine political party
 Pectoralis minor muscle
 Perchloromethyl mercaptan, a synthetic intermediate
 Percona Monitoring and Management
 Permanent magnet motor
 Permanent Multipurpose Module of the International Space Station
 Perpetual motion machine
 Plant matrix metalloproteinase
 Predictive mean matching, a statistical imputation method
 Prime Minister of Malaysia
 Printing and the Mind of Man
  Product Marketing Manager
 Public Money & Management, an academic journal